Anthony Hill (born January 2, 1985) is a former American football tight end who played in the National Football League. He was drafted by the Houston Texans in the fourth round of the 2009 NFL Draft. Hill attended Clear Brook High School in Friendswood, Texas. He played college football at North Carolina State.

Hill was also a member of the Philadelphia Eagles and Indianapolis Colts.

Early years
Hill attended the Hargrave Military Academy. As a senior, he recorded 10 catches after switching to tight end from defensive end. There, he played with future Wolfpack teammate wide receiver Darrell Blackman. He was rated No. 44 nationally at his position by Rivals.com.

College career
Hill played college football at North Carolina State. In his sophomore season, he caught 45 passes for 478 yards and earned second-team All-ACC honors. In July 2007, he tore his ACL and did not return until fall of 2008. In his senior year, despite missing four games with a chest injury, Hill caught 19 passes and scored four touchdowns.

Professional career

Pre-draft

Houston Texans
Hill was drafted by the Houston Texans in the fourth round of the 2009 NFL Draft. On October 2, 2009, word spread that Hill had contracted the H1N1 virus, also known as Swine flu and had been hospitalized. Head coach Gary Kubiak said publicly that Hill "is doing much better" and that "there's no panic at all".

He was waived on September 3, 2011, during final roster cuts.

Philadelphia Eagles
Hill was signed to the Philadelphia Eagles' practice squad on September 5, 2011.

Indianapolis Colts
Hill was signed to the Indianapolis Colts active roster on November 7, 2011, after starter Dallas Clark and backup Brody Eldridge went down with injuries.

References

External links
Philadelphia Eagles bio

1985 births
Living people
American football defensive ends
People from Friendswood, Texas
American football linebackers
American football tight ends
Houston Texans players
Philadelphia Eagles players
Indianapolis Colts players
NC State Wolfpack football players
Hargrave Military Academy alumni